Zapote Bridge is a stone arch pedestrian bridge crossing the Zapote River in the Philippines. It connects the cities of Las Piñas in Metro Manila and Bacoor in the province of Cavite. The bridge and its surrounding area was the site of two battles, the Battle of Zapote Bridge (1897) between Filipino revolutionaries and the Spanish colonial government in 1897 during the Philippine Revolution, and the Battle of Zapote River between Filipino and American forces in 1899 during the Philippine–American War. Because of these historic events, the bridge was designated as a National Historical Landmark by the National Historical Commission of the Philippines on September 9, 2013.

A modern concrete bridge, also named Zapote Bridge, carrying motorized vehicles and part of Aguinaldo Highway was constructed parallel to the original bridge.

Gallery

References 

Bridges in Metro Manila
National Historical Landmarks of the Philippines